Events in the year 1784 in Norway.

Incumbents
Monarch: Christian VII

Events
Georgernes Verft, a shipyard in Bergen, was established.

Arts and literature

Røros Church was built.

Births
7 March - Svend Borchmann Hersleb, professor of theology and politician (d.1836)
28 April - Jørgen von Cappelen Knudtzon, businessman and patron of the arts (d.1854)
12 June - Paul Andreas Kaald, navy officer and businessman (d.1867)
11 July - Olaus Michael Schmidt, judge and politician (d.1851)
26 September - Christopher Hansteen, astronomer and physicist (d.1873)

Full date unknown
Michael Sevald Aamodt, politician (d.1859)
Christian Ulrik Kastrup, jurist, military officer and politician (d.1850)
Jørgen Herman Vogt, politician (d.1862)
Tørris Johnsen Worum, politician

Deaths

See also